Santiago Rodríguez Taverna was the defending champion but lost in the quarterfinals to Genaro Alberto Olivieri.

Camilo Ugo Carabelli won the title after defeating Andrea Collarini 7–5, 6–2 in the final.

Seeds

Draw

Finals

Top half

Bottom half

References

External links
Main draw
Qualifying draw

Challenger de Tigre II - 1